Serge Gruzinski (born 5 November 1949) is a French historian. He is a Latin America specialist.

Career 
In 1969, he entered the École Nationale des Chartes and prepared a thesis on sixteenth-century Flanders under the direction of Pierre Goubert. In 1970, a trip to Mexico awakened his interest in this country. He was a member of the École française de Rome from 1973 to 1975 and the Casa de Velázquez in Madrid. In 1983, he joined the CNRS where he became research director in 1989. He is also the director of studies at the School for Advanced Studies in the Social Sciences since 1993.

Gruzinski is interested in the colonisation of the Americas and Asia, especially the colonial experiences like those cross-cultural areas, birth of hybrid spaces and first manifestations of globalisation.

In 2004, he was curator of the exhibition “” at the Musée du quai Branly.

In 2015, he won the International Grand Prize for History at the 22nd International Congress of Historical Sciences (ICHS).

Selected publications 

 Le destin brisé de l’empire aztèque, collection « Découvertes Gallimard » (nº 33), série Histoire. Éditions Gallimard, 1988 (new edition in 2010)
 US edition – The Aztecs: Rise and Fall of an Empire, “Abrams Discoveries” series. Harry N. Abrams, 1992
 UK edition – The Aztecs: Rise and Fall of an Empire, ‘New Horizons’ series. Thames & Hudson, 1992
 Co-author with Carmen Bernand, De l’idolâtrie : Une archéologie des sciences religieuses, collection « Philosophie Générale ». Seuil, 1988
 La colonisation de l’imaginaire : Sociétés indigènes et occidentalisation dans le Mexique espagnol (XVIᵉ-XVIIIᵉ siècle), collection « Bibliothèque des Histoires ». Éditions Gallimard, 1988
 Man-Gods in the Mexican Highlands: Indian Power and Colonial Society, 1520–1800, Stanford University Press, 1989
 Co-author with Carmen Bernand, Histoire du Nouveau Monde (2 volumes), Fayard, 1991 and 1993
 Painting The Conquest: The Mexican Indians and the European Renaissance, Flammarion, 1992
 Images at War: Mexico from Columbus to Blade Runner (1492–2019), Duke University Press, 2001
 The Mestizo Mind: The Intellectual Dynamics of Colonization and Globalization, Routledge, 2002
 The Eagle & the Dragon: Globalization and European Dreams of Conquest in China and America in the Sixteenth Century, Polity Press, 2014
 A History of Mexico City, University of California Press, 2019

References 

1949 births
20th-century French historians
21st-century French historians
Historians of Latin America
Academic staff of the School for Advanced Studies in the Social Sciences
École Nationale des Chartes alumni
Living people
People from Tourcoing